Mireille Juchau (born 1969) is an Australian author.

Early life and education
Juchau was born in 1969 and was raised in Sydney, New South Wales. She is of Jewish heritage.

She received First Class Honours and the University Medal from the University of Technology, Sydney (UTS) in 1994 for her BA thesis, Tracings: Writing memory and the Holocaust. She completed a doctorate in writing and philosophy from the University of Western Sydney in 2000, with her thesis Machines for feeling: Narrating autistic experience.

Career
Juchau was the fiction editor of HEAT magazine for some time.

She has been a peer on the Literature Board for the Australia Council for the Arts, a judge for the New South Wales Premier's Literary Awards and has lectured at UTS, University of New South Wales and Western Sydney University.

Recognition and awards

 2000 - shortlisted The Australian/Vogel Literary Award for Machines for Feeling
 2002 - winner, Perishable Theatre International Women's Playwriting Competition
 2004 - awarded the Marten Bequest Travelling Scholarship
 2008 - shortlisted Commonwealth Writers' Prize South East Asia and South Pacific Region — Best Book for Burning In
 2008 - highly commended Barbara Jefferis Award for Burning In
 2008 - shortlisted Nita Kibble Literary Award for Burning In
 2008 - shortlisted The Age Book of the Year Award — Fiction Prize for Burning In
 2008 - shortlisted Prime Minister's Literary Awards — Fiction for Burning In
 2015 - longlisted Notting Hill Editions International Essay Prize for The Most Holy Object in the House
 2016 - winner Victorian Premier's Literary Awards  —  The Vance Palmer Prize for Fiction for The World Without Us 
 2016 - shortlisted Stella Prize for The World Without Us 
 2016 - shortlisted Australian Book Industry Awards (ABIA) — Australian Literary Fiction Book of the Year for The World Without Us       
 2016 - longlisted Miles Franklin Award for The World Without Us  
 2016 - shortlisted New South Wales Premier's Literary Awards — Christina Stead Prize for Fiction for The World Without Us
 2016 - Longlisted International Dublin Literary Award for The World Without Us

She attended the New York State Summer Writer's School, USA in 2000 and has had several writing residencies at Varuna Writers Centre and Bundanon Arts Centre, Australia.

Selected works

Novels 
 Machines for Feeling (2001)
 Burning In (2007)
 The World Without Us (2015)

Drama
 White Gifts (2002)

References

External links

1969 births
Living people
21st-century Australian novelists
Australian women novelists
21st-century Australian women writers